Hamza Yacef (born August 25, 1979 in Sidi M'Hamed Algiers), is an Algerian footballer. He currently plays for CS Constantine in the Algerian Ligue Professionnelle 2.

Club career 
Yacef started his playing career with USM Alger, where he signed his first contract in 1997. He would play with the club for four seasons, winning the Algerian Cup twice in 1997 and 1999, and finishing twice as runner-up in the league in 1998 and 2001. In the summer of 2001, he signed a contract with NA Hussein Dey, who were playing in the second division. After just one season, he would help the team return to the top flight. He played three more seasons with NA Hussein Dey, scoring 26 goals in 73 appearances. In the summer of 2005, he signed with JS Kabylie.

In 2007, he signed a two-year contract with Moroccan club Wydad Casablanca worth $300,000.

Honours 
 Won the Algerian league once with JS Kabylie in 2006
 Won the Algerian Cup twice with USM Alger in 1997 and 1999

1979 births
Algerian footballers
Algeria international footballers
JS Kabylie players
Kabyle people
Living people
Footballers from Algiers
USM Alger players
NA Hussein Dey players
MC Alger players
MSP Batna players
Algerian Ligue 2 players
Expatriate footballers in Morocco
Wydad AC players
Algerian expatriate footballers
CS Constantine players
Algerian expatriate sportspeople in Morocco
Association football forwards
21st-century Algerian people